Bouchard, a Norman name with German elements means "fort" (bourgh) and "brave," "strong" (heard), see Burkhardt. It is also a French nickname for someone with a big mouth, "bouche" being French for mouth. Notable people with the name include:

 Several princes of Vendôme; see List of counts and dukes of Vendôme
Alain Bouchard (born 1949), Canadian businessman
Albert Bouchard, a member of the band Blue Öyster Cult
Anthony Bouchard, American politician
Benoît Bouchard (born 1940), Canadian politician
Camil Bouchard (born 1945), Canadian politician
Charles Bouchard, Royal Canadian Air Force general
Charles Jacques Bouchard, French pathologist
Claude Bouchard (born 1939), Canadian physiologist
Dan Bouchard (born 1950), Canadian hockey player
David Bouchard (born 1986), Professional Smite player 
Émile Bouchard (1919–2012), Canadian hockey player
Eugenie Bouchard (born 1994), Canadian tennis player
Evan Bouchard (born 1999), Canadian hockey player
Gérard Bouchard (born 1943), Canadian historian, sociologist and writer
Gilles Bouchard (born 1971), Canadian ice hockey coach 
Henri Bouchard (1875–1960), French sculptor
Hippolyte Bouchard (1780–1843), French and Argentine sailor and corsair
Jacinthe Bouchard, Canadian animal behaviorist and trainer
Jeanne-d'Arc Bouchard (born 1929), Canadian nun and nurse
Joe Bouchard, member of the band Blue Öyster Cult
Joel Bouchard (born 1974), Canadian ice hockey player
Ken Bouchard (born 1955), American NASCAR driver
Loren Bouchard (born 1969), American cartoonist, animator, voice actor, screenwriter, producer, director, and composer
Lucien Bouchard (born 1938), Canadian politician
Michel Marc Bouchard (born 1958), Canadian playwright
Mike Bouchard (born 1956), American politician
Pierre-François Bouchard (1772–1832), French captain 
Pierre-Marc Bouchard (born 1984), Canadian hockey player
Robert Bouchard (born 1943), Canadian politician
Sean Bouchard (born 1996), American baseball player
Simone Mary Bouchard (1912–1945), Canadian painter and textile artist
Télesphore-Damien Bouchard (1881–1962), Canadian politician 
Thomas J. Bouchard (born 1937), American psychologist

See also
Bouchard Père et Fils, a Burgundy wine producer
 Bouchard River, a tributary of the Franquelin River in Franquelin, Quebec, Canada
Burchard (name)
Burgheard (disambiguation)

French-language surnames